Albert-Ernest Carrier-Belleuse (1824-1887) was a French sculptor.

Carrier-Belleuse may also refer to:
 Louis-Robert Carrier-Belleuse, French painter and sculptor, and son of Albert-Ernest
 Pierre Carrier-Belleuse (1851-1932), French painter and son of Albert-Ernest

See also
 Belleuse
 Carrier (disambiguation)

French-language surnames
Compound surnames